Donald Scott Jessop (21 June 1927 – 21 May 2018) was an Australian politician. Born in Adelaide, he was educated at state schools and then the University of Adelaide, after which he became an optometrist at Port Augusta. He was a councillor with Port Augusta City. In 1966, he was elected to the Australian House of Representatives as the Liberal member for Grey, defeating sitting Labor member Jack Mortimer. He was defeated in 1969, but in 1970 was elected to the Senate. He remained in the Senate until he was defeated in 1987.  He had been dropped by his party, and chose to run as an Independent Liberal.

Jessop died at his Adelaide home, aged 90, on 21 May 2018.

References

 

1927 births
2018 deaths
Liberal Party of Australia members of the Parliament of Australia
Members of the Australian House of Representatives for Grey
Members of the Australian House of Representatives
Members of the Australian Senate for South Australia
Members of the Australian Senate
Independent members of the Parliament of Australia
University of Adelaide alumni
People from Port Augusta
20th-century Australian politicians
Australian optometrists